Sheykhlan-e Sofla (also Romanized as Sheykhlān-e Soflá; also known as Sheykhlān-e Pā'īn) is a village in Abish Ahmad Rural District, Abish Ahmad District, Kaleybar County, East Azerbaijan Province, Iran. At the 2006 census, its population was 323, in 83 families.

References 

Populated places in Kaleybar County